New World Productions was founded in 1972 with the printing of a 48-page booklet Diving and Recreational Guide to Florida Springs by Ned DeLoach. A few years later, the Diving Guide to the Florida Keys was published under the newly formed New World Publications. Several subsequent editions were combined in 1977 and greatly expanded into Ned DeLoach's Diving Guide to Underwater Florida, which currently is its 11th edition.

History
In the early 1980s a mutual friend introduced Ned to Paul Humann. A few years later, when the new owners of Ocean Realm magazine appointed Ned to the position of editor-in-chief, he invited Paul to join him as co-editor. Under their guidance, the once floundering publication became a success. It was during their two years at the magazine's helm that they discovered how well they worked together. When Ocean Realm was sold, they made the decision to leave the magazine business and concentrate their efforts on developing a series of marine life field guides for divers.

During Paul's decade-long stint as owner/operator of the Cayman Diver he had amassed an extensive library of underwater images. Combining his knowledge of marine wildlife and the dive business with Ned's background in education and publishing, the pair published the first edition of Reef Fish Identification - Florida, Caribbean, Bahamas in 1989. Since then the field guide has gone through 14 printings of three editions. The innovative, user-friendly fish identification guide was soon followed by two companion volumes, Reef Creature Identification (1992) and Reef Coral Identification (1993), which together make up the now famous Reef Set.

In 1993, Eric Riesch joined New World Publications to manage the business. Under his marketing, the second edition of Reef Fish Identification was awarded the Independent Book Publisher's Ben Franklin Award for best reference book of 1994. In 1995 Ned married Anna Douglas and the two spent every summer for the next 5 years in Bimini studying fish behavior. The result of their efforts was the 2000 publication of Reef Fish Behavior - Florida Caribbean Bahamas.

The popular, user-friendly format conceived for the tropical western Atlantic identification books spawned a series of fish identification books for other regions including the Galapagos Islands, the West Coast from California to Alaska and the Gulf of California to Panama. Paul and Ned partnered with the late John Jackson of Odyssey Publishing, ichthyologist Gerry Allen and Australian photographer Roger Steene for the 2003 publication of Reef Fish Identification - Tropical Pacific. New World also published Nudibranch Behavior by Dave Behrens, Sea Salt by Stan Waterman and Diving Pioneers by Bret Gilliam and helped distribute works for friends Howard Hall, Cathy Church, Helmut Debelius and Constantinos Petrinos. Anna produced the DVDs, Sensational Seas (2004), Reef Fish Identification - A Beginning Course (2007) and Sensational Seas Two (2010).

In November 2010, after five years of extensive field photography in the Pacific, New World Publications published Reef Creature Identification - Tropical Pacific, the most comprehensive field guide ever published about the marine invertebrate community of the vast region stretching from Thailand to Tahiti.

References 

Publishing companies established in 1972